Daviesia reclinata is a species of flowering plant in the family Fabaceae and is endemic to northern Australia. It is a prostrate or straggling shrub with scattered linear phyllodes, and yellow flowers.

Description
The flowers are arranged in leaf axils and on the ends of branches, usually in racemes of five to ten widely-spaced yellow flowers.

Taxonomy and naming
Daviesia reclinata was first formally described in 1837 by George Bentham from an unpublished manuscript by Allan Cunningham. Bentham's description was published in Flora Australiensis. The specific epithet (reclinata) means "leaning back, referring to the branches".

Distribution and habitat
This bitter-pea grows in forest or woodland on stony or sandy soil and is found the Kimberley region of Western Australian and the Top End of the Northern Territory. Michael Crisp considers populations formerly known as D. reclinata on the Cape York Peninsula of Queensland, to be D. flava.

References

reclinata
Flora of Western Australia
Flora of the Northern Territory
Plants described in 1864
Taxa named by George Bentham